Maida Vale is a London Underground station in Maida Vale in inner north-west London. The station is on the Bakerloo line, between Kilburn Park and Warwick Avenue stations, and is in Travelcard Zone 2.

The station is 'Grade II' listed building being of architectural and historic interest. In 2009 the station won a National Railway Heritage Award, in the London Regional category, for the successful modernisation of a historic station.

History 
Maida Vale opened on 6 June 1915 on Bakerloo tube's extension from Paddington to Queen's Park 5 months after the extension. At the time, it was the first station to be entirely staffed by women. The women continued to work at the Maida Vale station until 1919 when servicemen returning from the war displaced them. The outbreak of World War II again opened up jobs for women.
On 6 June 2015, the station celebrated its 100th anniversary as part of the 100 years of women in transport campaign.

Location and layout 
The station is located at the junction of Randolph Avenue and Elgin Avenue and has a surface building designed by Underground Electric Railways Company of London's architect Stanley Heaps. He used a standardized design that appears in many station buildings under control of UERL whilst Maida Vale was provided with buildings in the style of the earlier Leslie Green stations but without the upper storey, which was no longer required for housing lift gear. It was one of the first London Underground stations built specifically to use escalators rather than lifts.

Transport links

Bus routes 16, 98 and 332, and Night Bus routes N16 and N98 serve Maida Vale road, a short distance to the north-east.

In popular culture 
The station surface building and the distinctive staircase mosaics feature in Alfred Hitchcock's 1927 film Downhill, as well as the 1983 film Runners, written by Stephen Poliakoff. Both films feature shots down the escalators, those in the earlier production being the original wooden versions.

The exterior was used for a scene in the 1974 film adaptation of the popular British television situation comedy Man About the House.

A scene shot at platform level—complete with arriving train—appears in the video for The Chemical Brothers' single Believe (2005).

Maida Vale tube station also features in a montage of scenes in the 2013 Richard Curtis film About Time, where the two main characters enter and leave the different platforms via the escalators.

In the 2014 film Paddington, the exterior was used to depict the fictional 'Westbourne Oak' station, with interior scenes filmed at nearby St John's Wood Station.

Gallery

References

External links

London Transport Museum Photographic Archive

Bakerloo line stations
Tube stations in the City of Westminster
Former London Electric Railway stations
Railway stations in Great Britain opened in 1915
Tube station
Stanley Heaps railway stations